The September 2006 Yemen attacks were two attempted bombings of oil facilities in Yemen, carried out by suspected Islamic militants on September 15, 2006. All four attackers and one security guard died during the attacks.

Background 
There had been fears of an impending terrorist attack in Yemen since February 2006, when 23 Al Qaeda prisoners escaped from a Yemeni prison. The September 15th attacks came just before the country's Presidential elections. Only days before the attacks, Al Qaeda's second in command, Ayman al-Zawahiri, issued a videotaped threat of attacks on the Persian Gulf and on facilities he blamed for stealing Muslim oil; analysts point to Al Qaeda as the likely perpetrator of the attacks.

Dubba Port attack 
At 5:15 am local time, two attempted suicide bombers drove toward the Dubba Port in Hadhramaut Governorate, reportedly "at great speed", in an attempt to blow up storage tanks containing large amounts of oil. According to a statement by Yemen's Interior Ministry, the driver of the car was wearing a uniform similar to those worn by staff at the facility, and the second driver was dressed in a military uniform. The guards at the port managed to detonate the vehicles before it reached its target. In the resulting blast, one security guard was killed.

Mareb attack 
At 5:50 am, 35 minutes after the first attack, security guards at a refinery in Mareb blew up two cars loaded with explosives. The Interior Ministry statement reported that the vehicles, which were similar to those driven by the facility's staff, ". . . were driven by other suicide bomber terrorists who tried to break into [the facility]". The two attackers were killed; no one else was injured in the attack.

Perpetrators 
On November 7, 2007, a Yemeni court sentenced 32 men to between two and 15 years in prison after they were found guilty of supporting the attacks. The men had pleaded not guilty.

Footnotes

External links
Yahoo! news report of the attack (Link dead as of 02:13, 15 January 2007 (UTC))
"Suicide bombers foiled in Yemen attack" (Link dead as of 02:13, 15 January 2007 (UTC))
FOX News report of the attack

2006 murders in Yemen
2006 murders in Asia
Islamic terrorist incidents in 2006
September 2006 crimes
September 2006 events in Asia
Suicide car and truck bombings in Yemen
Terrorist incidents attributed to al-Qaeda in the Arabian Peninsula
Terrorist incidents in Yemen in 2006
Terrorist incidents in Yemen